Bentleigh Greens Soccer Club is an Australian semi professional soccer club based in Cheltenham, a suburb of Melbourne, Victoria. The club was formed in 1986, by the Greek Cypriot community and currently competes in the National Premier Leagues Victoria. Bentleigh made nationwide headlines when it became the first club below the A-League to make the semi-final of the FFA Cup in 2014. The Greens hit another milestone a year later when they claimed their first major trophy, the NPL Victoria title. In 2016, Bentleigh Greens became Victorian top-flight league premiers for the first time.

Bentleigh are one of six state league teams to have eliminated an A-League team in the FFA Cup, along with Heidelberg United FC, Redlands United FC, Green Gully SC, Adelaide City FC, and Blacktown City FC.

History

Formation and early years
In 1986, a small group of former members of Cypriot Community's Soccer Club, Central City, met at 15–17 Heffernan Lane. This group determined to create a strong Greek Cypriot based team in Melbourne. There were two previous failed attempts, one in the mid-1950s and secondly Central City from 1977 to 1983 which ran under the control of the Cyprus Community of Melbourne and Victoria from 1977 to 1980.

The "Founders" at this initial meeting were Michael Christopher, Ray Georgiou, Andrew Nicolaou, Michael Iaonnou, Harry Theocharous, Phillip Philippou, Tony Antoniou and Harry Constantinou. After making a huge fund raising effort and gathering together 150 foundation members they were able to take over Greensborough SC and move it to Victory Park in the City of Moorabbin. The name of the club was changed to Bentleigh Greens. The green colours were retained.

Rise to the Victorian Premier League
The club competed in the First Division of the Provisional League in 1987 season. That year the club finished runners up to Chelsea on goal difference, achieving promotion to Victorian League Division 4. The club was promoted to Division 3 in 1989 after a second-place finish, after just two years in Division 4. Bentleigh amazingly were promoted to Division 2 in 1990, having just been promoted to Division 3 that year. Two more promotions followed in 1993 and 1995, taking the Greens from Division 2 to the Victorian Premier League for the first time in the club's history. The 1995 promotion was the fifth promotion for the club in nine years, marking a very impressive rise through the ranks of Victorian football for the recently established Bentleigh side.

Bentleigh went into their first ever VPL campaign under the management of Harry Chalkitis, managing a fourth-place finish and qualifying for the finals series. The Greens met Green Gully SC in the elimination final, but went down 3–1. The following campaign was even stronger for Bentleigh, finishing runners-up in the regular season, finishing just two points behind winners Altona Magic, but then lost 4–1 to Green Gully in the qualifying final and 2–1 to Bulleen Inter Kings in the semi-final to crash out. Mark Bresciano scored the winner for Bulleen Inter that day.

Bentleigh were relegated in 2005, going down to the Victorian State League Division 1 for the first time since 1995. The side finished bottom of the league, managing just 16 points in 26 games. The Greens narrowly avoided successive relegations, finishing 10th in a 12 team league with the bottom two going down. The side finished just three points above the relegated Northcote City FC. Bentleigh were promoted back to the top flight in 2009, finishing second with 41 points. The side would have missed out on promotion and finished third had St Albans Saints not been deducted nine points that season. In their first season back in the top flight, the Greens finished in 10th place, one above relegation.

Bentleigh made the VPL grand final in 2013, finishing third in the regular season. On their way to the final, Bentleigh beat Melbourne Knights FC 4–2 and then Northcote City 2–1, but lost to Northcote City in the grand final 3–2 in extra time.

2014–2015: FFA Cup run and first major title
The club made nationwide headlines after making it to the semi-final of the inaugural FFA Cup in 2014. The Greens beat Blacktown City 1–0 in the Round of 32, Sydney Olympic 2–1 in the Round of 16, Adelaide City 2–1 in the quarter finals before going down 3–0 to A-League side Perth Glory. The match against Adelaide City was played in front of almost 2,000 people at Kingston Heath Soccer Complex, while the match against Perth Glory drew a reported 3,300 people. Bentleigh brought in a number of high-profile players for the 2015 season, including the likes of Daniel Visevic, Steven Topalovic and Queensland trio Troy Ruthven, Matt Thurtell and Chris Lucas. The season hit a major snag when the Greens were knocked out of the 2015 FFA Cup in the qualifying stages by the unfancied Ballarat Red Devils but ended in fine style with the Club winning its first ever major title when it beat South Melbourne at Lakeside Stadium in the Grand Final, 3–1 after extra time. Bentleigh finished runners-up to South Melbourne in the regular season, missing out on the minor and major double on goal difference.

2016—present: More silverware
The Greens secured reigning NPL Victoria Gold Medal winner Kamal Ibrahim, but lost key first-team players Steven Topalovic, Daniel Visevic and Alastair Bray, with Bray signing for A-League side Central Coast Mariners. Bentleigh kicked off season 2016 by claiming the FFV Community Shield, beating South Melbourne at Kingston Heath 3–0. Bentleigh again met rivals South Melbourne at the final qualifying stage for the 2016 FFA Cup. The Greens would go on to smash their opponents 4–0, sending the side through to the national stage of the Cup competition. In August, Bentleigh took out the 2016 Dockerty Cup, the second major trophy in its history and first Dockerty Cup title, with a 1–0 victory over Green Gully at ABD Stadium in Broadmeadows, with Ryan Paczkowski scoring and Ryan Scott delivering an outstanding performance in goals. Just four days later, the Greens picked up their third piece of silverware for 2016, winning the NPL Victoria minor premiership for the first time in its history.

Bentleigh were drawn against Adelaide-based side North Eastern MetroStars in the Round of 32 of the FFA Cup in 2016, winning on penalties, with the game tied at 2–2 after 90 minutes and 3–3 after extra time. Bentleigh were drawn away from home against Tasmanian side Devonport City in the Round of 16. Battling torrential rain and a stubborn Strikers side, it took extra time for Bentleigh to win through to the quarter-finals, with Matthew Thurtell scoring the game's lone goal in front of 3,000 fans at Valley Road. In the quarter-finals, Bentleigh was paired with reigning Cup holders and A-League heavyweights Melbourne Victory. Two second half goals to the A-League side saw it win out 2–0 in front of 3,754 people at Kingston Heath, a record crowd for the venue. After the clash, iconic captain Wayne Wallace announce his departure from the club after six years of service.

In preparation for the 2017 season, Bentleigh lost Kamal Ibrahim to Avondale FC and Liam McCormick to South Melbourne. However, the club exercised its muscle and added former A-League duo Ben Litfin and Andy Brennan. After a fourth-placed league finish, Bentleigh secured its second NPL Championship in three years when it beat Heidelberg United 2-1 after extra time in the Grand Final, with Ross Honos scoring in the 106th minute to win the tie. Goalkeeper Ryan Scott took out the Jim Rooney Medal, awarded to the best player on the pitch.

Bentleigh became the 6th member federation side in FFA Cup history to knock out an A-League opponent when it beat Wellington Phoenix FC 1–0 at Kingston Heath in August 2018. Bentleigh beat Broadmeadow Magic 4–0 at Magic Park in the Round of 16 and Heidelberg 1–0 in the quarter finals to set up another clash with A League opposition, this time Adelaide United. A goal in either half saw the Reds come away from Melbourne with a 2–0 win. In the league, the Greens finished a point off top spot, but lost 4–3 to Avondale in the semi-final.

In January 2019, new A-League team Western United FC announced that Bentleigh head coach John Anastasiadis would join the club as an assistant coach. Anastasiadis' last game in charge was an NPL Victoria Round 13 victory over the previously undefeated Avondale, propelling the Greens to second spot on the table. John Gabrielson was appointed as the new head coach after Anastasiadis' departure. Gabrielson's tenure proved to be short-lived, with Frank McGrellis taking over in July 2019. After Kingston City's relegation from the NPL Victoria was confirmed, Kingston's coach Nick Tolios was confirmed as the new Bentleigh Greens coach, mid-way through the 2019 NPL Victoria finals series. Tolios led the Greens to a 2–1 victory over premiers Heidelberg and a penalty shoot-out win over Avondale in the NPL Victoria Grand Final at AAMI Park to make it three championships in five years for the Cheltenham-based club.

For 2023 Season, Bentleigh Greens made the direction to appoint Alfredo Costantino as the club's first-ever full-time senior coach. Following an extensive process in which the club was inundated with applications, the Greens have welcomed Alfredo to the club. A UEFA A-Licensed coach, Alfredo arrived at the Greens with a wealth of coaching experiences. In his time within the Victorian football system, he has coached teams to a league title and several promotions.

Current squad

Honours
National Premier Leagues Victoria
Champions: 2015, 2017, 2019
National Premier Leagues Victoria
Premiers: 2016
Victorian Premier League
Finalists: 1996, 1997, 2001, 2002, 2019
Victorian State League Division 1
Champions: 1995
Victorian State League Division 2
Runners Up: 1993
Victorian State League Division 3
Runners Up: 1990
Victorian State League Division 4
Runners Up: 1989
Dockerty Cup
Champions: 2016, 2018, 2022
Dockerty Cup
Runners Up: 2017
FV Community Shield
Champions: 2016, 2017, 2019, 2020
Hellenic Cup
Champions: 1991, 1996, 1997, 2002, 2003

Individual honours
Victorian Premier League Player of the Year Award
1996 – Ike Alagiozidis

2002 – Jim Kourtis

Bill Fleming Medal
1996 – Ike Alagiozidis

Victorian Premier League Coach of the Year Award
1997 – Harry Chalkitis

Victorian Premier League Leading Goalscorer Award
2002 – Juan Nilo

Victorian Premier League Goalkeeper of the Year Award
2002 – Jim Kourtis

Victorian Premier League Under 21 Player of the Year Award
1996 – Vlad Babic

Competition timeline

References

External links
 Official club website
 Bentleigh Greens on OzFootball

 
National Premier Leagues clubs
Soccer clubs in Melbourne
Victorian Premier League teams
Greek-Australian culture in Victoria
Association football clubs established in 1986
1986 establishments in Australia
Diaspora sports clubs in Australia
Sport in the City of Kingston (Victoria)
Cypriot diaspora